René Dérency (May 27, 1925 – October 18, 1954) was a French basketball player who competed in the 1948 Summer Olympics. He was part of the French basketball team, which won the silver medal.

He died in a car accident.

References

External links
René Dérency's profile at databaseOlympics.com

1925 births
1954 deaths
French men's basketball players
Olympic basketball players of France
Basketball players at the 1948 Summer Olympics
Olympic silver medalists for France
Olympic medalists in basketball
Medalists at the 1948 Summer Olympics
Road incident deaths in France